The year 1900 in film involved some significant events.

Events
 Reulos, Goudeau & Co. invent Mirographe, a 21 mm amateur format.
 The Lumière Brothers premiere their new Lumiere Wide format for the 1900 World Fair. At 75 mm wide, it has held the record for over 100 years as the widest format yet developed.
 Raoul Grimoin-Sanson also creates a sensation at the 1900 World Fair with his multi-projector Cinéorama spectacle, which uses ten 70 mm projectors to create a simulated 360-degree balloon ride over Paris. The exhibit is closed before it formally opens, however, due to legitimate health and safety concerns regarding the heat of the combined projectors ons, and releases the format as La Petite.
 Gaumont-Demeny release their own 15 mm amateur format, Pocket Chrono.
 Release of the first film version of Hamlet, an adaptation of the duel scene, with French actress Sarah Bernhardt playing the title rôle (sic.) and accompanying recorded sound.
 Making of the first film to feature the detective character Sherlock Holmes, Sherlock Holmes Baffled, by the American Mutoscope and Biograph Company.
Jeanne d'Arc becomes the first film of considerable length (10 mins) to be shown entirely in colour.
 William N. Selig made The Chicago Stockyards—From Hoof to Market for Chicago-based Philip Danforth Armour, a prominent businessman in the meatpacking industry, showing the full meatpacking process from cattle being unloaded at the stockyards to canning. Studio lights didn't exist yet so stage spotlights had to be borrowed from the Richard Mansfield Theatrical Company to film inside the slaughterhouse.

Notable films released in 1900

#
 20,000 Employees Entering Lord Armstrong's Elswick Works, Newcastle upon Tyne, produced by Mitchell and Kenyon – (GB)

A
 Army Life; or, How Soldiers Are Made: Mounted Infantry (lost), a documentary directed by Robert W. Paul – (GB)
 As Seen Through a Telescope, directed by George Albert Smith – (GB)
 Attack on a China Mission, directed by James Williamson – (GB)
 Automobile Parade, directed by William C. Paley – (US)

B
 Battle of Mafeking, directed by James H. White – (US)
 The Beggar's Deceit, directed by Cecil Hepworth – (GB)

C
 Chinese Magic (aka Yellow Peril), directed by Walter R. Booth – (GB)
 The Clown and the Alchemist, directed by J. Stuart Blackton and Albert E. Smith – (US)

D
 Danse Serpentine (In a Lion's Cage), directed by Alice Guy – (France)
 Davy Jones' Locker, directed by Frederick S. Armitage – (US)

E
 The Enchanted Drawing, directed by J. Stuart Blackton – (US)
 Explosion of a Motor Car, directed by Cecil Hepworth – (GB)

F
 A Fantastical Meal (Le Repas fantastique), directed by Georges Méliès – (France)
 Faust and Marguerite, directed by Edwin S. Porter, based on the 1859 opera by Charles Gounod – (US)

G
 Going to Bed Under Difficulties (Le Déshabillage impossible), directed by Georges Méliès – (France)
 Grandma's Reading Glass, directed by George Albert Smith – (GB)

H
 How He Missed His Train (Le Réveil d'un monsieur pressé), directed by Georges Méliès – (France)
 How It Feels to Be Run Over, directed by Cecil Hepworth – (GB)

J
 A Jersey Skeeter, directed by Arthur Marvin – (US)
 Joan of Arc (Jeanne d'Arc), directed by Georges Méliès – (France)

K
 The Kiss, directed by Edwin S. Porter – (US)

L
 Ladies' Skirt Nailed to a Fence, produced by Bamforth & Co Ltd – (GB)
 Let Me Dream Again, directed by George Albert Smith – (GB)

M
 Messrs Lumb And Co., Leaving The Works, Huddersfield, produced by Mitchell and Kenyon – (GB)
 Eine moderne Jungfrau von Orléans, directed by Max Skladanowsky – (Germany)
 The Mystic Swing, directed by Edwin S. Porter – (US)

O
 The One-Man Band, directed by Georges Méliès – (France)

R
 Reproduction of the McGovern and Dixon Fight, starring Terry McGovern and George Dixon – (US)
 Rough Sea, produced by Bamforth & Co Ltd. – (GB)

S
 Sherlock Holmes Baffled, directed by Arthur Marvin – (US)
 Soldiers of the Cross (lost), directed by Joseph Perry – (Australia)
 Solser en Hesse (lost), directed by M.H. Laddé – (Netherlands)

T
 The Two Blind Men (Les Deux Aveugles) (lost), directed by Georges Méliès – (France)

U
 Uncle Josh in a Spooky Hotel, directed by Edwin S. Porter – (US)
 Uncle Josh's Nightmare,  directed by Edwin  S. Porter – (US)

V
 Le village de Namo – Panorama pris d'une chaise à porteurs, directed by Gabriel Veyre – (France)

Births

Date unknown 
Juanita Angeles, Filipina pre-war and silent film actress

Deaths

 November 22 – Arthur Sullivan, producer of musicals, half of the team of Gilbert and Sullivan (born 1842)
 November 30 – Oscar Wilde, playwright whose works were made into films (born 1854)
 December 31 – Hannibal Goodwin, retired minister, in 1886 invented nitrate film roll. (born 1822)

Debut
 Sarah Bernhardt
 Benoit Constant Coquelin

References

 
Film by year
Articles containing video clips